Hormone-sensitive lipase (HSL), also previously known as cholesteryl ester hydrolase (CEH), sometimes referred to as triacylglycerol lipase, is an enzyme that, in humans, is encoded by the LIPE gene, and catalyzes the following reaction:

(1) diacylglycerol + H2O = monoacylglycerol + a carboxylate
(2) triacylglycerol + H2O = diacylglycerol + a carboxylate
(3) monoacylglycerol + -H2O = glycerol + a carboxylate

HSL is an intracellular neutral lipase capable of hydrolyzing a variety of esters. The enzyme has a long and a short form. The long form is expressed in steroidogenic tissues such as testis, where it converts cholesteryl esters to free cholesterol for steroid hormone production. The short form is expressed in adipose tissue, among others, where it hydrolyzes stored triglycerides to free fatty acids.

Nomenclature 
During fasting-state the increased free fatty acid secretion by adipocyte cells was attributed to the hormone epinephrine, hence the name "hormone-sensitive lipase". Other catecholamines and adrenocorticotropic hormone (ACTH) can also stimulate such  responses. Such enzymatic action plays a key role in providing major source of energy for most cells.

Activation 

Extracellular hormones, such as glucagon, epinephrine, Thyroid-Stimulating Hormone, or ACTH, bind to their respective G protein–coupled receptors (GPCR). When a GPCR is activated by its extracellular ligand, a conformational change is induced in the receptor that is transmitted to an attached intracellular heterotrimeric G protein complex by protein domain dynamics. The Gs alpha subunit of the stimulated G protein complex exchanges GDP for GTP in a reaction catalyzed by the GPCR and is released from the complex. The activated Gs alpha subunit binds to and activates an enzyme called adenylyl cyclase, which, in turn, catalyzes the conversion of ATP into cyclic AMP (cAMP). cAMP binds to and activates Protein Kinase A (PKA). It is PKA, activated by a hormone-induced signal transduction cascade, that phosphorylates and activates Hormone Sensitive Lipase (HSL), hence the name. In addition to phosphorylating HSL, PKA phosphorylates perilipins on the surface of lipid droplets within adipose cells. This triggers them to "spread out"  and allow for HSL to enter the lipid droplet. 

Activation of partially purified HSL requires Mg2+, ATP, and cyclic AMP. Activation can be blocked when Ser552 is not phosphorylated because Ser554 is phosphorylated and when the dephosphorylation of Ser552 causes insulin to the insulin receptor, causing inhibition of lipolysis and stimulation of glucose transport.

Hormone stimulation of lipolysis in humans is similar to rats.

Function 

The main function of hormone-sensitive lipase is to mobilize stored fats. HSL functions to hydrolyze either a fatty acid from a triacylglycerol molecule, freeing a fatty acid and diglyceride, or a fatty acid from a diacylglycerol molecule, freeing a fatty acid and monoglyceride. This process allows energy metabolism in mammals. Although Hormone-Sensitive Lipase (HSL) is able to catalyze hydrolysis of triglycerides and diglycerides, another enzyme found in adipose tissue, Adipose triglyceride lipase (ATGL), has a higher affinity for triglycerides than HSL, and ATGL predominantly acts as the enzyme for triglyceride-specific hydrolysis in the adipocyte. Hormone-sensitive lipase, which has 11-fold greater affinity for diglycerides than triglycerides, predominantly cleaves these diglycerides, forming 2-monoglyceride and a free fatty acid. 

HSL is activated when the body needs to mobilize energy stores, and so responds positively to catecholamines, ACTH. It is inhibited by insulin.

Another important role is the release of cholesterol from cholesteryl esters for use in the production of steroids and cholesterol efflux.  Activity of HSL is important in preventing or ameliorating the generation of foam cells in atherosclerosis.

References

Further reading

External links 
 

EC 3.1.1